Jeroen Drost (born 21 January 1987 in Kampen) is a Dutch retired professional  footballer, who played as a left back.

Club career 
Drost began his career with DOS Kampen and later joined the youth of Go Ahead Eagles from Deventer. He played some years with the youth from Go Ahead Eagles before being scouted in 2001 by SC Heerenveen. After three years in the youth academy of SC Heerenveen, he was promoted to the first team in 2004. Drost moved on loan to N.E.C. in January 2008. After a half year and five league matches with NEC, he returned to Heerenveen, and was once again loaned out, this time to Vitesse in July 2008.

Vitesse eventually decided to sign Drost, and he received a four-year contract lasting until mid-2013, but loaned him to FC Zwolle for half a season in 2011. He moved to De Graafschap in 2012, but only played 3 matches in an injury-hit season and was released by the club in April 2013.

After leaving de Graafschap, Drost moved into amateur football and joined Hoofdklasse outfit CSV Apeldoorn, only to leave them for childhood club DOS Kampen in winter 2015.

International career 
Drost represented his homeland in at the 2005 FIFA World Youth Championship in the Netherlands.

Personal life 
His twin brother Henrico Drost is also a professional footballer, currently playing for RKC Waalwijk.

References

External links 
 Interview
 Voetbal International Profile

1987 births
Living people
People from Kampen, Overijssel
Association football fullbacks
Dutch footballers
Netherlands under-21 international footballers
Netherlands youth international footballers
SC Heerenveen players
NEC Nijmegen players
SBV Vitesse players
PEC Zwolle players
De Graafschap players
Eredivisie players
Eerste Divisie players
Dutch twins
Twin sportspeople
CSV Apeldoorn players
Footballers from Overijssel